1-(2-Pyridinyl)piperazine is a chemical compound and piperazine derivative. Some derivatives of this substance are known to act as potent and selective α2-adrenergic receptor antagonists, such as 1-(3-fluoro-2-pyridinyl)piperazine.

A few pyridinylpiperazine derivatives are drugs, including:

 ABT-724
 AR234960
 Azaperol [2804-05-9]
 Azaperone — antipsychotic
 Atevirdine — antiretroviral
 BRN 0563047 [59215-20-2] "Stimulating dopaminerginic activity": Journal Ref (Cmp XVIII):
 CP-226,269
 Delavirdine — antiretroviral
 Mirtazapine — antidepressant
 MLS1547 [315698-36-3]
 Revenast [85673-87-6]
 UMB38
 XH-148

See also 
 Diphenylmethylpiperazine
 Benzylpiperazine
 Phenylpiperazine
 Pyrimidinylpiperazine

References 

Piperazines
2-Pyridyl compounds